Kyonpyaw District is a district of the Ayeyarwady Region in Myanmar.

The Kyonpyaw District is Ayeyarwady Region's newest district formed out of three townships formerly part of Pathein District. Its main administrative GAD Office was opened on July 1, 2022 and its District court was opened on September 1, 2022. The District consists of Kyonpyaw Township, Kyaunggon Township and Yekyi Township.

References 

 

Districts of Myanmar